Rhynchospora globosa, known by the Spanish common name of estrellita de sabana ("savannah starlet"), is a member of the sedge family, Cyperaceae. It is a perennial herb, found throughout the tropics of Central and South America. The variant R. globosa var. tenuifolia is endemic to Cuba.

References

External links

globosa
Flora of South America
Flora of Central America
Flora of Cuba
Plants described in 1816
Plants described in 1817